Professor Shahla Khatun FCPS FRCOG is a Bangladeshi physician and National Professor.

Early life and family
Khatun was born into a Bengali Muslim political family in Sylhet. Her father, Abu Ahmad Abdul Hafiz, a judge in profession, was one of the founders of the Sylhet branch of the All-India Muslim League and took part in the Pakistan Movement. Her mother, Syeda Shahar Banu, was one of the leading women of the Bengali language movement. She has thirteen siblings including AM Abdul Muhith, a former Finance Minister of Bangladesh, and AK Abdul Momen, the country's incumbent Minister of Foreign Affairs.

Career
Khatun is a gynecologist. She has served IPGMR, currently Bangabandhu Sheikh Mujib Medical University as a professor and head of department, Department of Obstretics and Gynecology. She was inducted as a National Professor by the government of Bangladesh in 2011. She also taught at the Bangladesh Medical College.

References

National Professors of Bangladesh
Living people
Bangladeshi gynecologists
Bangladeshi people of Arab descent
Year of birth missing (living people)
People from Sylhet